Multiwinner approval voting, also called approval-based committee voting, is a multi-winner electoral system that uses approval ballots. Each voter may select ("approve") any number of candidates, and multiple candidates are elected. The number of elected candidates is usually fixed in advance. For example, it can be the number of seats in a country's parliament, or the required number of members in a committee.

Multiwinner approval voting is an adaptation of approval voting to multiwinner elections. In a single-winner approval voting system, it is easy to determine the winner: it is the candidate approved by the largest number of voters. In multiwinner approval voting, there are many different ways to decide which candidates will be elected.

Majoritarian approval voting

Versions

Block approval voting (unlimited voting) 
The straightforward extension of approval balloting to multi-winner elections is called block approval voting and is a type of multiple non-transferable vote, where each voter can select an unlimited number of candidates, and the k candidates with the most approval votes win (where k is the predetermined committee size). This does not provide proportional representation and is subject to the Burr dilemma, among other problems.

Limited block approval voting 
Limited block approval voting is a type of multiple non-transferable vote, in which the k candidates with the most votes win, and each voter can select a limited number of candidates, but that limit is more than k. This is subject to the same problems as unlimited block approval voting.

Plurality-at-large and limited voting 

Plurality-at-large or plurality block voting (BV) and limited voting (LV) are both types of the multiple non-transferable vote category of multi-winner systems. Under plurality block voting, each voter has up to as many votes as there are seats to be filled, but no more than one per candidate and under limited voting, each voter has less votes than seats to be filled. Plurality block voting provides majoritarian representation, while limited voting is semi-proportional. Therefore voting reform advocates refrain from calling it approval voting, similarly to how first-past-the-post or single-winner limited voting are not considered approval voting.

Example for comparison 
Candidates are running in a 3 member district of the 10000 voters. Voters may not cast a more than one vote for a single candidate.

 Under block approval voting (unlimited voting) voter may vote for any number of candidates
 Under limited block approval voting voters may cast 6 votes maximum (twice as many as there are winners)
 Under (plurality) block voting, voters may cast 3 votes (but do not have to)
 Under limited (block) voting, voters may cast 2 votes maximum.
 Under the single non-transferable vote, voters may cast 1 vote.

Party A has about 35% support among the electorate (with one particularly well-like candidate), Party B around 25% (with two well-like candidates) and the remaining voters primarily support independent candidates, but mostly lean towards party B if they have to choose between the two parties. All voters vote sincerely, there is no tactical voting.

 Under the single non-transferable vote (not a type of approval voting), the 3 most popular candidates according to voters first preferences are elected, regardless of party affiliation.
 Under limited voting, it is most likely that the party with a plurality takes 2 seats (the number of votes each voter has), and the minority party receives the remaining seats.
 Under (plurality) block voting, the party with plurality support most likely wins all seats.
 Under limited block approval voting voters, voters of independent candidates may use their extra votes to help candidates other than their top3, which may result in the reversal of the plurality block vote result.
 Under block approval voting, any party-affiliated or independent candidates particularly popular among the population may be elected, but it is possible that about half of the population can elect no representatives.

Proportional approval voting 
Methods such as Proportional approval voting, Sequential proportional approval voting, and the Method of Equal Shares
  have the advantage of guaranteeing proportional representation in case all supporters of a party approve all candidates of that party. In the general case, proportional representation is replaced by a more general requirement called justified representation.

In these methods, the voters fill out a standard approval-type ballot, but the ballots are counted in a specific way, that produces proportional representation.

Party-approval voting 
Party-approval voting (also called approval-based apportionment) is a method in which each voter can approve one or more parties, rather than approving individual candidates. It is a combination of multiwinner approval voting with party-list voting.

Other methods 
Other ways of extending Approval voting to multiple winner elections are satisfaction approval voting excess method, and minimax approval. These methods use approval ballots but count them in different ways.

Usage 
Multiwinner approval voting, while less common than standard approval voting, is used in several places.

Block approval voting 
 Korean villages used block approval voting for competitive elections following the surrender of Japan, according to observations made by journalist Anna Louise Strong in 1946: "In one village there were twelve candidates, of whom five were to be chosen for the Village Committee. Each voter was given twelve cards, bearing the names of the candidates. He then cast his chosen ones into the white box and the rejected ones into the black."
 Several Swiss cantons elect their government using such methods and so do French cities with population below 1000.
 In 1963, the proportional representation system in East Germany was replaced by a procedure in which the candidates had to receive more than 50% of the votes. Had more candidates than seats in this constituency won the majority, the order of the list would determine who would join the Volkskammer.

References 

Multi-winner electoral systems
Approval voting